Alton (also known as Warrens Shop) is an unincorporated community in Halifax County, Virginia, United States.

Visitor attractions
Brandon Plantation, listed on the National Register of Historic Places
Virginia International Raceway

References

Unincorporated communities in Halifax County, Virginia
Unincorporated communities in Virginia